PIPT or PiPT can refer to;

 Physically indexed, physically tagged, a type of CPU cache
 Propylisopropyltryptamine (PiPT), a psychedelic tryptamine derivative
 Photoinduced phase transitions, a technique used in solid-state physics
 a high affinity phosphate transporter (PiPT) found in the fungus Piriformospora indica